Kevin Campion may refer to:

Kévin Campion (born 1988), French racewalker
Kevin Campion (rugby league) (born 1971), Australian rugby league footballer